Lazzaro Mocenigo or simply Mocenigo was the name of at least three ships of the Italian Navy named in honour of the Venetian admiral Lazzaro Mocenigo and may refer to:

 , a  launched in 1919 and discarded in 1937.
 , a  launched in 1937 and sunk in 1943.
 , a  launched in 1968 and decommissioned in 1993.

Italian Navy ship names